Mount Davidson may refer to:

 Mount Davidson (Alberta)
 Mount Davidson (Antarctica)
 Mount Davidson (British Columbia)
 Mount Davidson (California), highest point of San Francisco.
 Mount Davidson (Nevada)